The 2019–20 CAF Confederation Cup (officially the 2019–20 Total CAF Confederation Cup for sponsorship reasons) was the 17th edition of Africa's secondary club football tournament organized by the Confederation of African Football (CAF), under the current CAF Confederation Cup title after the merger of CAF Cup and African Cup Winners' Cup.

This season is the first to follow an August–to-May schedule, as per the decision of the CAF Executive Committee on 20 July 2017. However, the COVID-19 pandemic caused the semi-finals and final of the competition to be postponed until October 2020. Moreover, for the first time, the final was played as a single match at a venue pre-selected by CAF, and was played at the Prince Moulay Abdellah Stadium in Rabat, Morocco.

The winners of the 2019–20 CAF Confederation Cup earned the right to play against the winners of the 2019–20 CAF Champions League in the 2020–21 CAF Super Cup. Zamalek were the title holders, but as they qualified for the 2019–20 CAF Champions League and reached the group stage, they were not able to defend their title.

Association team allocation
All 56 CAF member associations may enter the CAF Confederation Cup, with the 12 highest ranked associations according to their CAF 5-Year Ranking eligible to enter two teams in the competition. As a result, theoretically a maximum of 68 teams could enter the tournament (plus 16 teams eliminated from the CAF Champions League which enter the play-off round) – although this level has never been reached.

For the 2019–20 CAF Confederation Cup, the CAF uses the 2015–2019 CAF 5-Year Ranking, which calculates points for each entrant association based on their clubs’ performance over those 5 years in the CAF Champions League and CAF Confederation Cup. The criteria for points are the following:

The points are multiplied by a coefficient according to the year as follows:
2018–19 – 5
2018 – 4
2017 – 3
2016 – 2
2015 – 1

This was announced by the CAF on 4 June 2019, as using the previous scheme, it would be based on results from 2014 to 2018. The only change for the top 12 associations is that Tanzania is included while Ivory Coast is excluded.

Teams
The following 53 teams from 42 associations entered the competition.
Eleven teams (in bold) received a bye to the first round.
The other 42 teams entered the preliminary round.

Associations are shown according to their 2015–2019 CAF 5-Year Ranking – those with a ranking score have their rank and score indicated.

A further 16 teams eliminated from the 2019–20 CAF Champions League enter the play-off round.

Notes

Associations which did not enter a team

 

Associations which did not enter a team initially, but had a team transferred from Champions League

Schedule
The schedule of the competition is as follows.

On 24 November 2019, CAF made a change to all fixtures dates starting from the group stage matchday 4 to the final, due to rescheduling of the 2020 African Nations Championship from January/February to April. The quarter-finals draw date was also changed.

Following the quarter-finals, due to the COVID-19 pandemic in Africa, the semi-finals, originally scheduled for 3 May (first legs) and 10 May (second legs), were postponed indefinitely on 11 April 2020, and the final, originally scheduled for 24 May, was also postponed on 18 April 2020. On 30 June 2020, the CAF Executive Committee proposed that the competition would resume with a Final Four format played as single matches in Morocco. On 3 August 2020, the CAF announced that the competition would resume with the semi-finals played on 22 September, and the final played on 27 September. On 10 September 2020, the CAF announced that at the request of the Royal Moroccan Football Federation, the semi-finals were rescheduled to 19–20 October, and the final to 25 October.

Qualifying rounds

Preliminary round

First round

Play-off round

Group stage

In each group, teams play against each other home-and-away in a round-robin format. The group winners and runners-up advance to the quarter-finals of the knockout stage.

Group A

Group B

Group C

Group D

Knockout stage

Bracket

Quarter-finals

Semi-finals

Final

Top goalscorers

See also
2019–20 CAF Champions League
2020–21 CAF Super Cup

Notes

References

External links
Total CAF Confederation Cup, CAFonline.com
CAF Total Confederation Cup 2019/20

 
2019-20
2
2
Association football events postponed due to the COVID-19 pandemic